McKendree Spring is a progressive folk-rock band, formed in 1968 and particularly active in the early 1970s.  The band, originally known as McKendree Spring Quartet, formed at Adirondack Community College in Queensbury, New York. The group's leader was Fran McKendree (vocals and guitar); their first bass player was Larry Tucker then Fred Holman; Dr. Michael Dreyfuss (electric violin, viola, Moog, Arp, Mellotron); and Martin Slutsky (electric guitar). Christopher Bishop replaced Holman on bass as of the 1973 release Spring Suite. Some of their music ventured into avant-garde or experimental territory, such as "God Bless the Conspiracy" from their album 3, with its violin/viola/synthesizer solo by Dreyfuss.

Steve Anderson (bass and vocals) and Alan Stoker (drums and vocals) were added for the "Live at the Beachland" live performance recording and 2007 release. In addition, Dave Morrison (harmonica) also played on the live album.

In the summer of 2010, Christopher Bishop (bass and vocals) rejoined the group for the recording of 5 songs for "McKendree Spring: Recording No. 9". This recording also featured Alan Stoker (drums/percussion/vocals), Paul Hollowell (keys) and Fred Mollin (synth).

The band reunited for one final show at the legendary Douglas Corner club in Nashville, May 2013, which was video recorded and released in Dec. 2015 on DVD as McKendree Spring: Times Like These.  Fran McKendree, Mike 'Doc' Dreyfuss, and Marty Slutsky, the three founding members of the band, are supported by bassist Chris Bishop, keyboardist Paul Hollowell [Dolly Parton], Nashville standouts Alan Stoker (drums and vocals) and Rock Williams on sax, along with harmony singing by Carol Anderson and Sharon Ferrara Slutsky.

According to the official site, Michael Dreyfuss died on September 25, 2017.

Fran McKendree (born Robert Francis McKendree on May 9, 1947 in Springfield, Massachusetts) died of cancer on June 10, 2021, at age 74.

Albums

Charted singles

References

External links
Official site
Fran McKendree Official site
McKendree Spring on Facebook

American folk rock groups